The 5th Nigerian Academy of Science Media Awards ceremony honoring Broadcast Journalist and Newspaper Columnist of 2014 was held at the Conference Room C of the Protea Hotel, Isaac John Street, GRA Ikeja, Lagos State, Nigeria on May 7, 2015.

Winners and nominees
Entries were open for the award in March 2015 and closed on April 1, 2015. The article submission must have been aired or published between January and December 2014 and only one entry is permitted per applicant.
Entries for the Print category must consist of a scanned copy of the original article, without any form of alteration to the content of the original published article. 
Folashade Adebayo, The Punch Newspaper Columnist emerged winner in the Print Category for her two-part article on the coverage of the Ebola Virus Disease outbreak in 2014.
The first part of the article was titled "A Walk Through The Valley of Ebola" and the second part titled "Ebola: Nigerian Health workers Take Battle to the Lion’s Den as its headline.
Vvienne Irikefe, a Television Continental's correspondent  emerged winner in the Broadcast Category and Jennifer Igwe, an editor of the Nigerian Television Authority emerged as runner-up in the same category.

References

Nigerian awards
21st century in Lagos
2014 awards
2015 in Nigeria